Achurch is a surname. Notable people with the surname include:

 Claude Achurch (1896–1979), Australian cricketer
 James Achurch (1928–2015), Australian javelin thrower
 Janet Achurch (1863–1916), English actress and actor-manager
 Mitchell Achurch (born 1988), Australian rugby league player

References